Mnemonic is a Norwegian privately owned cybersecurity company and managed security service provider (MSSP) founded in 2000. The company is headquartered in Oslo with additional presence in Stavanger, Kista, Sweden, The Hague, London, and Palo Alto, and is with 241 employees (2019) one of the largest companies in the computer security business within the Nordics.

Mnemonic functions as an advisor for Europol.

References

Companies based in Oslo
Software companies established in 2000
Norwegian companies established in 2000